2013 Ncell Cup 2013, the A division knockout football tournament held in December, 2013 at Dashrath Stadium, Kathmandu, Nepal.The Second edition of the Ncell Cup tournament, sponsored by telecommunications company Ncell, will be participated by 12 clubs ranked under the ‘A’ division. Ranipokhari Corner Team withdrew from the tournament citing financial problems and were deducted 3 points in the 2013–14 league season.

Group stage
Given below facts are accurate as of 2 October 2012.

Group A

Group B

Group C

Group D

Matches

Quarter-final

Semi-final

Final

References

Ncell Cup
Ncell